"The Fun They Had" is a science fiction story  by American writer Isaac Asimov. It first appeared in a children's newspaper in 1951 and was reprinted in the February 1954 issue of The Magazine of Fantasy and Science Fiction, Earth Is Room Enough (1957), 50 Short Science Fiction Tales (1960), and The Best of Isaac Asimov (1973).

Written as a personal favor for a friend, "The Fun They Had" became "probably the biggest surprise of my literary career", Asimov wrote in 1973. He reported that it had been reprinted more than 30 times with more being planned. It is about computerized homeschooling, and what children miss out on by not being in school together. He surmised that the story was popular with children because "the kids would get a bang out of the irony."

Summary

On the day of 17 May 2155, Tommy found a real book. He showed it to Margie. Margie was eleven years old. She had never seen a real book before. She had once heard from her grandfather about printed books. It was a very old book. Its pages have turned yellow and crinkly. They turned its pages and read them. Tommy found it just a waste. They had no printed books. Their books flashed on the television screen. Tommy who was of thirteen had read more books on the television screen than Margie.

Tommy told Margie that it was a book about school. Margie always hated school. Her school was situated in a room in her home. It was in the room next to her bedroom. Her Mechanical teacher flashed on her television screen at a fixed time daily except on Saturday and Sunday. She had to attend alone. This mechanical teacher asked her questions, gave her homework and checked it. It also checked the assignment test papers and awarded them.

Margie’s mechanical teacher had been giving her test after test. Margie’s performance had been going from worse to worst. Her mother called for the County Inspector. He set the speed of the mechanical teacher right up to the level of an average ten-year child. Tommy told Margie that hundreds and hundreds of years ago there was an old kind of school. Those schools were situated in a special building. Human teachers taught in them. All the kids went there and learned the same thing. Margie thought that it would be great fun to study in those schools. She wanted to read about those funny schools.

Just then Margie’s mother called Margie to attend her school. Margie was reluctant but she had to go inside her schoolroom nonchalantly. It was right next to her bedroom. Her mechanical teacher was on and waiting for her. It asked Margie to put her homework in the proper slot. Margie heaved a big sigh. The mechanical teacher was teaching her the mathematics topic of fractions but she was thinking about the schools of the old days and the fun they had.

References

External links
The Fun They Had: short  story by Isaac Asimov at Sussex Middle School (New Brunswick, Canada)'s site
"The Fun They Had", The Magazine of Fantasy & Science Fiction Vol. 6, No. 2, February 1954, pp. 125-7, at the Internet Archive

 Short stories by Isaac Asimov
1951 short stories
 Science fiction short stories
 Works originally published in The Magazine of Fantasy & Science Fiction
 Fiction set in the 22nd century